San Jose is a census-designated place in Graham County, Arizona, United States. Its population was 467 as of the 2020 census.

Demographics

References

Census-designated places in Graham County, Arizona